KBYO (1360 AM) was a radio station broadcasting a gospel music format. Licensed to Tallulah, Louisiana, U.S., the station served the Monroe area. The station was owned by First United Methodist Church of Tullulah, Louisiana.

History
The station was assigned the call sign KZZM on 1982-11-15. On 1990-02-01, the station changed its call sign to KBYO.

On November 21, 2014, the Federal Communications Commission cancelled KBYO's license, due to the station having been silent for more than twelve months.

References

External links

Radio stations in Louisiana
Radio stations established in 1954
Radio stations disestablished in 2014
Defunct radio stations in the United States
Defunct religious radio stations in the United States
1954 establishments in Louisiana
2014 disestablishments in Louisiana
Defunct mass media in Louisiana